Perixera was a genus of moths in the family Geometridae. It is now considered a synonym of Anisodes.

Selected species
Perixera absconditaria (Walker, 1862)
Perixera anulifera (Hampson, 1893)
Perixera monetaria (Guenée, 1858)
Perixera obrinaria (Guenée, 1858)

References